Mardel may refer to:

Places
Mar del Plata, a city in Buenos Aires Province, Argentina

People
Adam Mardel (born 1989), American pop singer
Carlos Mardel (c. 1695–1763), Hungarian-Portuguese military officer, engineer, and architect
Guy Mardel (born 1944), French singer

See also
Mardell